The Houston Comets were a Women's National Basketball Association (WNBA) team based in Houston. Formed in 1997, the team was one of the original eight WNBA teams and won the first four championships of the league's existence. They are one of two teams in the WNBA that are undefeated in the WNBA Finals; the Seattle Storm are the other. The Comets were the first dynasty of the WNBA and are tied with the Minnesota Lynx and Seattle Storm for the most championships of any WNBA franchise. The team was folded and disbanded by the league in 2008 during the height of the Great Recession because new ownership could not be found.

The Comets were known for courting great women's basketball stars. The team had among its members Cynthia Cooper (the WNBA's first MVP); college and national team standout Sheryl Swoopes; Kim Perrot, who succumbed to cancer in 1999; and college stars Michelle Snow and Tina Thompson.

Franchise history

Building the first dynasty of the WNBA (1997–2000)
The Comets were one of the founding teams in the WNBA. They capped off the league's inaugural season in 1997 with a win over the New York Liberty in the WNBA championship game to win the WNBA's first championship.

When the league expanded the next season, the Comets were moved from the Eastern Conference to the Western Conference. In 1998, they put together a win loss record of 27-3 for a .900 winning percentage – a WNBA record that still stands.  They went on to repeat as champions, defeating the Phoenix Mercury in the first-ever WNBA Finals that year due to the championship game being extended into a three-game championship series.

In 1999, led by what was already known as the Big Three, (Cynthia Cooper, Sheryl Swoopes and Tina Thompson), the Comets survived a highlight-film, last-second, court-to-court, game-winning shot by the Liberty's Teresa Weatherspoon in Game 2 of the finals to beat the Liberty in three games and win their third straight title, this one after the death of teammate Kim Perrot, who died of cancer.

In 2000, behind league MVP Sheryl Swoopes and eventual WNBA Finals MVP Cynthia Cooper, the Comets beat the New York Liberty in two games to win their fourth title in a row cementing themselves as the greatest WNBA team ever assembled. 2000 was the Comets' last championship and last WNBA Finals appearance in franchise history.

The years of change and rebuilding (2001–2006)
After Cooper retired in 2001, Houston clinched the playoffs with a 19–13 record, but lost in the first round in a sweep to the 2001 eventual champion Los Angeles Sparks. In 2002, when Swoopes was injured most of the year with a torn ACL, the Comets were able to qualify for the playoffs with a 24–8 record, but lost to the Utah Starzz in 3 games. In 2003, they qualified to the playoffs for the 7th straight year, but they lost in the first round to the Sacramento Monarchs in 3 games. They missed the playoffs for the first time in franchise history with a record of 13–21 in 2004, but returned to the playoffs with a 19–15 record, finishing 3rd. In the first round, the Comets knocked out the 2004 defending champion Seattle Storm in 3 games, but lost in the conference finals to the Sacramento Monarchs in a sweep, which Sacramento later became WNBA Champions in 2005. Houston would return to the playoffs with an 18–16 record, but lost to the 2005 defending champion Sacramento Monarchs in another sweep. 2006 was the last playoff appearance for the Houston Comets. After the Comets' season ended in 2006, the Comets underwent major front-office changes during the off-season.  In October 2006, team owner Leslie Alexander (who also owned the NBA's Houston Rockets) announced he was selling the Comets, and longtime head coach Van Chancellor resigned in January 2007.

New ownership and a new home (2007)
On January 31, 2007, the WNBA Board of Governors approved the sale of the team to Hilton Koch, a Houston-based mattress and furniture businessman.  Two weeks later, Comets assistant coach Karleen Thompson was named to become the team's new head coach and general manager for the 2007 season.

For the 2007 season, they would miss the playoffs for the second time in franchise history after starting the season 0-10, resulting in a 13–21 record.

On December 12, 2007, team owner Hilton Koch announced that the Comets would be moving from the Toyota Center to Reliant Arena for the 2008 WNBA season. This resulted in a loss of fans. The Toyota Center drew 13,000 fans, but the Reliant Arena could only house 7,200. In 2008, the Comets' final year, they only drew an average 6,000 fans per game and sold out four games.

End of the era (2008)
In 2008, Koch put the team up for sale, with an asking price of $10 million. No investors stepped up. The WNBA took over management of the Comets and disbanded the team in December 2008. They stated that they would only be suspending operations in 2009, which some people saw as a sign that the franchise could be revived if an investor came in. Comets players were sent off to other teams in a dispersal draft.

League president Donna Orender said that the collapse of the Comets was not a sign that the WNBA was in trouble. Former player Cynthia Cooper-Dyke said that the loss of the Comets was "disturbing news" and that the Comets were integral to the WNBA.

The Comets played their final home game on September 15, 2008 at the Strahan Coliseum on the campus of Texas State due to Hurricane Ike.  They defeated the Sacramento Monarchs 90–81. They finished the season 17-17 and missed the playoffs for the third time in their history.

Season-by-season records

Team owners
Leslie Alexander (1997–2006)
Hilton Koch (2007–2008)
WNBA (2008)

Players of note

Final roster

Retired numbers

Former Comets
Tiffani Johnson
Matee Ajavon
Janeth Arcain
Octavia Blue
Latasha Byears
Dominique Canty
Cynthia Cooper, now the head coach of the Texas Southern Women's Basketball Team
Tamecka Dixon
Ukari Figgs
Nekeshia Henderson
Sonja Henning
Tammy Jackson
Shannon Johnson
Amanda Lassiter
Edwige Lawson
Tynesha Lewis
Rebecca Lobo
Sancho Lyttle
Mwadi Mabika
Hamchétou Maïga
Kim Perrot
Jennifer Rizzotti, now the head coach of the George Washington Colonials Women's Basketball Team
Michelle Snow
Dawn Staley, now the head coach of the South Carolina Gamecocks Women's Basketball Team
Sheryl Swoopes, now assistant coach of Texas Tech Women's Basketball Team
Lindsay Taylor
Tina Thompson, formerly the head coach of Virginia Cavaliers Women's Basketball Team
Amaya Valdemoro
Coquese Washington, now assistant head coach of Notre Dame Fighting Irish  Women's Basketball Team
Kara Wolters
Monica Lamb-Powell

FIBA Hall of Fame

Coaches and others
Head coaches:
 Van Chancellor (1997–2007) (served as the women's head basketball coach at Louisiana State University from 2007 to 2011)
 Karleen Thompson  (2007–2008)

General managers
 Carroll Dawson (1997-2007)
 Karleen Thompson (2007–08)

References

External links

 
Basketball teams established in 1997
Basketball teams disestablished in 2008
Defunct Women's National Basketball Association teams
Basketball teams in Houston